Borima is a village in Troyan Municipality, Lovech Province, northern Bulgaria.

References

Villages in Lovech Province